The Masquerader is a 1914 film written and directed by Charlie Chaplin during his time at Keystone Studios. This film stars Chaplin and Roscoe Arbuckle and has a running time of 13 minutes. It is the tenth film directed by Chaplin.

Plot
The film revolves around making films at Keystone Studios. Charlie plays an actor who bungles several scenes and is kicked off the studio. The next day a strange, beautiful woman appears to audition for the film - it's Charlie in disguise. After doing a perfect impersonation of a female, Charlie has drawn the attention of the director who hires the new "actress" for his films. The director gives the beautiful woman the men's dressing room to change in. While there, Charlie returns to his tramp costume. When the director returns looking for the woman, he finds Charlie and realizes he has been tricked. Angry, the director chases Charlie through the studio until Charlie decides to jump into what he thinks is a prop well. The film ends with the director and other actors laughing at Charlie as he is trapped in the bottom of a real well. The plot involving a man dressing up as a woman was quite popular in silent movies.

Review
A reviewer from Bioscope wrote, "Here we have Mr. Chaplin rehearsing for a cinematograph production, in which he gives a really remarkable female impersonation. The makeup is no less successful than the characterization, and it is further proof of Mr. Chaplin's undoubted versatility."

Cast
 Charlie Chaplin - Film actor
 Roscoe 'Fatty' Arbuckle - Film actor
 Chester Conklin - Film actor
 Charles Murray - Film director
 Jess Dandy - Actor/villain
 Minta Durfee - Leading lady
 Cecile Arnold - Actress
 Vivian Edwards - Actress
 Harry McCoy - Actor
 Charley Chase - Actor

See also
 List of American films of 1914
 Charlie Chaplin filmography
 Fatty Arbuckle filmography

References

External links

Short films directed by Charlie Chaplin
1914 films
American black-and-white films
1914 comedy films
American silent short films
Silent American comedy films
Keystone Studios films
Cross-dressing in American films
Films produced by Mack Sennett
1914 short films
Articles containing video clips
American comedy short films
1910s American films